Ilia Peiros (full name: Ilia Iosifovich Peiros, Илья Иосифович Пейрос; born 1948) is a Russian linguist who specializes in the historical linguistics of East Asia. Peiros is a well-known scholar in the Moscow School of Comparative Linguistics, known for its work on long-range comparative linguistics.<ref>Journal of Language Relationship].</ref> Peiros is affiliated with the Santa Fe Institute in New Mexico, United States and was also a former faculty member at the University of Melbourne.

Education
In 1971, Peiros graduated from the Department of Theoretical and Applied Linguistics at Moscow State University. In 1976, he defended his Ph.D. thesis on Sino-Tibetan consonantism.

Career
In the article "An Austric Macrofamily: some considerations", Peiros proposed that Austro-Tai (comprising Austronesian and Tai-Kadai), Miao-Yao (Hmong-Mien), and Austroasiatic were all related to each other as part of the Austric language macrofamily.

In 1996, together with Sergei Starostin, he published a 6-volume comparative dictionary of the Sino-Tibetan languages.

Peiros also does research on Amerindian historical linguistics as part of the Evolution of Human Languages (EHL) project, led by Georgiy Starostin.

Selected publications

Peiros, Ilia. 1998. [https://openresearch-repository.anu.edu.au/bitstream/1885/146631/1/PL-C142.pdf Comparative Linguistics in Southeast Asia. Pacific Linguistics, Research School of Pacific and Asian Studies, Australian National University.
Comrie, Bernard and Ilia Peiros. 2000. "Austroasiatic and Tai-Kadai Languages in the Intercontinental Dictionary Series." In The Fifth International Symposium on Languages and Linguistics, Ho Chi Minh City, 89-117. Vietnam National University, Ho Chi Minh City University of Social Sciences and Humanities.
Peiros, Ilia. 1997. "Lolo-Burmese Linguistic Archaeology." In The Mon-Khmer Studies Journal, 27: 233–248.
Jukes, Anthony and Ilia Peiros. 1996. "A Katuic Cultural Reconstruction." In The Fourth International Symposium on Language and Linguistics, Thailand, 827–849. Institute of Language and Culture for Rural Development, Mahidol University.
Peiros, Ilia. 1996. "The Vietnamese Etymological Dictionary and 'new' Language Families." In The Fourth International Symposium on Language and Linguistics, Thailand'', 883–894. Institute of Language and Culture for Rural Development, Mahidol University.

References

External links
Academia.edu page

Living people
1948 births
Linguists from Russia
Paleolinguists
Santa Fe Institute people
Long-range comparative linguists
Moscow School of Comparative Linguistics